Saint-Révérien is a commune in the Nièvre department in central France. It takes its name from St. Reverianus.

See also
Communes of the Nièvre department

References

Communes of Nièvre